Record Hill is the highest hill on North Island in the Houtman Abrolhos. It is about 13 metres (42 ft) high.

Record Island was discovered on 22 May 1840 by John Clements Wickham, Commander during the third voyage of HMS Beagle: "The highest hill on the south-west point, measuring 42 feet, received the name of Record Hill, from our leaving a paper in a bottle, giving an account of our cruise."

References

North Island (Houtman Abrolhos)
Mountains of Western Australia